The UEFA Regions' Cup is a football competition for amateur teams in Europe, run by UEFA. It was held for the first time in 1999 and has been played biennially since. The 2019 champions are the Lower Silesia team from Poland.

The competition was created in 1996 as there was no European level competition for amateur teams. The UEFA Amateur Cup, a previous attempt to organise a continental competition for amateurs, had run from 1966 to 1978, but ceased due to lack of interest from both the public and amateur teams themselves. In contrast to today's Regions' Cup, in which amateur regions are represented, the previous competition was for representative amateur national teams.

Each UEFA member nation may enter one representative amateur team into the competition, with regions having to win a domestic amateur competition (such as the FA Inter-League Cup) in order to qualify.

The first two finals were won by teams from the host nation and, thus far, Italy has been the most successful nation in the competition, with their representatives winning three of the nine editions (two of these were hosted in Italy, with Veneto winning both).

Format
All of the 55 UEFA-affiliated associations are eligible to submit a team to compete in the Regions' Cup, provided they hold a domestic qualifying competition to decide which team will represent that nation. Smaller member nations, however, are permitted to enter a representative national side.

Teams were entered by 32 nations for the inaugural tournament in 1999 and competed in one qualifying round. As interest in the tournament grew over the years, the qualifying stage was enlarged and an extra group round added in 2005, scrapping the playoffs added in 2001.

The preliminary round consists of a small number of teams split into groups, with the best from each group being included in the draw for the intermediary round. In the intermediary round, the teams are placed into eight groups of four teams. The teams in each group play each other once and the team finishing top of the group qualifies for the Regions' Cup finals. The eight group winners are placed into two groups of four for the final tournament and the winners of these two final groups, after each team has played one another once, play in the final, with the winners being crowned champions. Third place is shared between the two teams which finish second in their respective groups.

One aspect of the Regions' Cup that is different from most other international club tournaments is the hosting of games. As teams play each other once in the preliminary and intermediary rounds, in contrast to the more common two-legged fixtures, each group has all its matches held in one particular region. For example, in the 2009 tournament, all the preliminary Group 1 matches were played in San Marino. Another unusual feature of the Regions' Cup is the choice of host for the final tournament. In most football tournaments, the host nation or city is decided by the governing body before qualification begins. In the Regions' Cup, however, the host is chosen only after most of the eight finalist teams have qualified, with one of the qualified regions selected as host.

Results

Finals

Titles by country 

* = Hosts

See also
List of UEFA Regions' Cup qualifying competitions
UEFA Amateur Cup

References

External links

RSSSF page containing information on all previous UEFA Regions' Cups
Regions Cup History

 
Regions
Amateur association football